Arthur (Walter's Field) Aerodrome  is located  east of Arthur, Ontario, Canada.

See also
List of airports in the Arthur area

References

External links
Page about this airport on COPA's Places to Fly airport directory

Registered aerodromes in Wellington County, Ontario